The 1923 Victorian Football Association season was the 45th season of the Australian rules football competition. The premiership was won by the Footscray Football Club, after it defeated Port Melbourne by 14 points in the Grand Final on 1 October. It was the club's eighth VFA premiership, which meant that the club surpassed Geelong (L.) for the most premierships won in VFA history.

Rule changes 
In 1923, the League and Association entered into a new agreement in which players could not transfer from one competition to the other without a clearance from his club and a permit from his current competition. Such a rule had existing prior to 1918, but since it had lapsed a refusal by one competition to permit a transfer was not binding in the other. The League was motivated to enter into the agreement by the aggressive recruiting of some Association clubs over the previous few years.

Premiership 
The home-and-home season was played over eighteen rounds, with each club playing the others twice; then, the top four clubs contested a finals series under the amended Argus system to determine the premiers for the season.

Ladder

Finals

Awards 
 Carpenter (Williamstown) was the leading goalkicker for the home-and-home matches, with 61 goals, narrowly beating George Taylor (Port Melbourne), who kicked 58 goals. Across all matches including finals, Taylor (65) led from Carpenter (63).

External links 
 List of VFA premiers

References 

Victorian Football League seasons
VFL